Patang Hotel, officially Neelkanth Patang – The Revolving Restaurant is a revolving restaurant located in Ahmedabad, Gujarat, India.

History 
The restaurant is named Patang, literally a fighter kite in Gujarati language. It was designed by an architect Hasmukh Patel.

Architecture and services 
The design was inspired by Chabutaro, a traditional tower-like structure where the birds are fed. It completes a 360 degree revolution in 90 minutes. It is located near the Sabarmati Riverfront on the bank of Sabarmati river which enables the view of old and new city of Ahmedabad for the visitors.

It is a buffet restaurant serving 40-45 types of vegetarian dishes of Indian, Continental, Thai and Chinese origin. It is also considered as a tourist attraction.

Gallery

See also
 List of revolving restaurants

References 

Buildings and structures in Ahmedabad
Revolving restaurants
Restaurants in India